Demophilus ( Demophilos), according to Herodotus, was the commander of a contingent of  700 Thespians at the Battle of Thermopylae (480 BC). His father was Diadromes.

Demophilus and his men fought at the battle and at the end they stood along with the 300 Spartans at the last stand, all were killed. The ancient Greek traveler and geographer Pausanias also wrote about the stay of the Thespians at Thermopylae together with the Spartans.

After the Battle of Thermopylae, the Persian army burned down the city of Thespiae. The citizens  had fled to the Peloponnese. Later, the Thespians fought against the Persian army at the Battle of Plataea (479 BC).

Demophilos is immortalised in many books and movies. In the 1962 movie The 300 Spartans, Demophilus was portrayed by the Greek actor Yorgos (George) Moutsios.

In Thermopylae there is a monument, next to the monument of Leonidas, in memory of him and his men. There is also a monument to Demophilus in the modern Thespies.

References

Battle of Thermopylae
5th-century BC Greek people
Ancient Greeks killed in battle
480 BC deaths
Greek people of the Greco-Persian Wars
Year of birth unknown
Ancient Boeotians